Osmose Productions is a French independent record label created in 1991 by Hervé Herbaut, after he had spent three years running a small mail order company. They specialize mainly in death and black metal bands.

Many of the groups who began with Osmose would move on to sign with larger labels, such as Nuclear Blast, Century Media and Metal Blade.

Bands

See also
 List of record labels

References

External links
 
 Osmose Productions @ Discogs.com
 Interview with Hervé Herbaut
 Interview with Hervé Herbaut @ Tartarean Desire

French independent record labels
Record labels established in 1991
Death metal record labels
Black metal record labels
1991 establishments in France